Carl Morgan (born 1981) is a former producer of the rap group So Solid Crew. In October 2005, he was sentenced to 30 years for murdering a love rival.

He was tried before a jury for the murder of 24-year-old Colin Leyon Scarlett in Tooting, South London, in November 2004.

Colin Scarlett, the partner of Morgan's ex-girlfriend (who has two children by Morgan), had beaten Morgan up earlier on the day of the murder. Morgan then returned with a gun and shot Scarlett.

The jury failed to reach a verdict on the same charge faced by So Solid Crew rapper Megaman, who faced a retrial in March 2006 where the jury was discharged before a verdict could be reached. A second retrial began in September 2006, and on 28 September Megaman was found not guilty of murder at the Old Bailey.

Morgan's trial judge recommended that he should spend at least 30 years in prison before being considered for parole, a recommendation that is expected to keep him behind bars until at least 2034 and the age of 53.

Morgan appeared in So Solid Crew's video for the track "21 Seconds".

References

1981 births
Living people
English record producers
English people convicted of murder
Hip hop record producers
People convicted of murder by England and Wales
People from Battersea
Prisoners sentenced to life imprisonment by England and Wales
Rappers from London
So Solid Crew members
English prisoners sentenced to life imprisonment
Black British musicians
English people of Zambian descent